Herbert Alan Peach (6 October 1890 – 8 October 1961) was an English cricketer who played for Surrey. He was an all-rounder: a right-handed batsman and a right-arm medium pace bowler.

Alan Peach was born in Maidstone, Kent.  World War I delayed his first-class debut until 1919, when he was already 28, but in a career that extended until 1931 he still managed to take 795 wickets at 26.58 and score 8940 runs at 23.71. The highest of his four hundreds was 200 not out, made against Northamptonshire at Northampton in 1920, when he shared in a stand of 171 in forty-two minutes with Percy Fender. A notably hard striker of the ball, in 1924 he hit balls from both Bates of Glamorgan and Newman of Hampshire clean out of The Oval. During the same season, he dismissed four Sussex batsmen with consecutive balls, also at The Oval, finishing with eight wickets for 60, his best innings analysis.

He played six times for the Players against the Gentlemen between 1923 and 1928. According to David Lemmon "he launched himself at the game with a zest, and the crowd loved him for it".

He was Surrey coach from 1935 to 1939 and discovered Alec and Eric Bedser. He died at North End, Newbury, Hampshire.

References

Wisden obituary

English cricket coaches
English cricketers
Surrey cricketers
1890 births
1961 deaths
Players cricketers
Berkshire cricketers
English cricketers of 1919 to 1945
Players of the South cricketers
C. I. Thornton's XI cricketers
Lord Hawke's XI cricketers
A. E. R. Gilligan's XI cricketers